Carex klaphakei, Klaphake's sedge, is a species of flowering plant in the family Cyperaceae, native to the Central Tablelands of New South Wales, Australia. It is known from only three locations, all hanging swamps of the Blue Mountains.

References

klaphakei
Endemic flora of Australia
Flora of New South Wales
Plants described in 1996